Alick Strawson Barningham (22 February 1889 – 4 January 1956) was an Australian rules footballer who played for the Carlton Football Club in the Victorian Football League (VFL).

Death
He died at his residence in Golden Square, Victoria on 4 January 1956.

Notes

References

External links

 
 Alex Barningham at The VFA Project
 Alex Barningham's profile at Blueseum

1889 births
1956 deaths
Australian rules footballers from Melbourne
Carlton Football Club players
People from Brunswick, Victoria